Kayabí (Caiabi; also Kawaiwete) is a Tupian language spoken by the Kayabí people of Mato Grosso, Brazil. Although the Kayabi call themselves Kagwahiva, their language is not part of the Kagwahiva language.

It is spoken in the Xingu Indigenous Park and Apiaká-Kayabi Indigenous Territory.

Phonology

Consonants 

/f/ can also be heard as a bilabial fricative .

Vowels

References

External links
 Lapierre, Myriam. 2018. Kawaiwete Field Materials. Survey of California and Other Indian Languages. 

Tupi–Guarani languages
Object–subject–verb languages
Languages of Xingu Indigenous Park